Colonel John Campbell (died 1804) was a British Army officer who became Lieutenant-Governor of Plymouth.

Military career
Campbell served as commanding officer of the 22nd Regiment of Foot and saw action at Newport, Rhode Island in May 1778 during the American Revolutionary War. He became Lieutenant-Governor of Plymouth in 1782 with the additional responsibility, from 1793, of the command of Western District. He retired in August 1803 and died in 1804.

References

Cheshire Regiment officers
1804 deaths
British Army personnel of the American Revolutionary War